This is a list of Asian records in Olympic weightlifting. These records are maintained in each weight class for the snatch lift, clean and jerk lift, and the total for both lifts by the Asian Weightlifting Federation (AWF).

Current records

Men

Women

Historical records

Men (1998–2018)

Women (1998–2018)

References
General

Specific

External links
AWF web site
Asian Records 1993–1997

Asian Records
Weightlifting in Asia
Weightlifting